Osanica is a village in the municipality of Žagubica, Serbia. According to the 2002 census, the village had a population of 1,187 people.

References

Populated places in Braničevo District